Pasteosia orientalis is a moth of the subfamily Arctiinae. It was described by George Hampson in 1909. It is found in Lesotho and South Africa.

References

Lithosiini
Moths described in 1909